Gash (also Romanized as Gāsh; also known as Gāsh-e Mayāmey, Gash Meyamey, Gāsh Mīāmey, and Kās) is a village in Isin Rural District, in the Central District of Bandar Abbas County, Hormozgan Province, Iran. At the 2006 census, its population was 27, in 13 families.

References 

Populated places in Bandar Abbas County